Sanctity is the condition of being considered sacred.

Sanctity may also refer to:

 Sanctity of life, the idea that life is sacred
 Sanctity (band), a heavy metal band from Asheville, North Carolina
 Madame Sanctity, a Marvel Comics character